Italohippus is a genus of grasshoppers in the subfamily Gomphocerinae (unassigned to any tribe); it was erected by Fontana and La Greca in 1999.  To date (2022) species have only been recorded from Italy.

Species 
The Orthoptera Species File lists:
 Italohippus albicornis (La Greca, 1948) - type species (as Chorthippus albicornis La Greca)
 Italohippus modestus (Ebner, 1915)
 Italohippus monticola (Ebner, 1915)

References

External links

Orthoptera genera
Orthoptera of Europe
Gomphocerinae